Brij Behari Prasad, also spelled Brij Bihari Prasad (died 13 June 1998) was an Indian politician. A member of the Rashtriya Janata Dal (RJD) (then Janata Dal), he had become Minister for Science and Technology in the state of Bihar, where he represented the RJD. He had been arrested for alleged involvement in corrupt admissions to technical institutes and was murdered on 13 June 1998 while being treated at the Indira Gandhi Institute of Medical Sciences in Patna, where he was undergoing treatment while in custody. It was claimed that his death was in retribution for those of Chhottan Shukla and five other people, who had been killed on 4 December 1994 when on their way home from campaigning for the Bihar Legislative Assembly elections that were to take place in 1995. Shukla was a gangster from the Bhumihar community, whereas Prasad was a Bania. Supporters of Prasad were thought to have been responsible for the killing of Shukla.

Political career
Prasad served as science and technology minister in Rabri Devi's government and also as energy minister in Janata Dal government in Bihar. He was known for his muscleman image and was popular among OBCs in his constituency. A close ally to Lalu Prasad Yadav, the influence of Prasad was often used by the Janata Dal to change the voting behaviour in the areas of his influence. The use of money and muscle power was evident in those days and various political parties including the Indian National Congress relied upon criminal politicians to ensure victory. Prasad was allegedly involved in the assassination of Devendranath Dubey, a Samajwadi Party MLA and member of Motihari Lok Sabha constituency in 1996. The assassination preceded winning of Motihari constituency election by Rama Devi, the wife of Prasad. Dubey himself was a proclaimed absconder while Prasad was facing several criminal charges. The influence of Prasad was witnessed from east Champaran to Muzaffarpur district of Bihar. According to Ranbir Sammadar he was credited with ending the crime empire of Devendra Dubey, the Congress leader who later shifted his allegiance to Samajwadi Party.

According to local media outlets of Bihar, Prasad ensured the victory of several backward caste candidates against the upper-caste strongmen who dominated their respective constituencies due to  their influence and muscle power. These include Munna Shukla, who was defeated by Prasad's nominee Kedar Gupta and Raghunath Pandey who was defeated by Bijendra Chowdhary from Muzaffarpur constituency. The nominees of Prasad viz Basawan Bhagat, Maheswar Yadav and Ramvichar Rai also emerged victorious from their respective constituencies. The climax of his political influence was witnessed after his wife, Rama Devi defeated Radha Mohan Singh from Motihari.

Assassination
Prasad was also known for his tussle with Chhotan Shukla, another gangster and a leader of Bihar People's Party of Anand Mohan Singh. Shukla was killed while he was returning from his election campaign by the goons who were allegedly working for Prasad. Prasad was earlier arrested for his alleged involvement in BECEE scam and was getting treatment in Indira Gandhi Institute of Medical Science, Patna. While he was taking a stroll outside his ward surrounded by the commandos of Bihar military police, a man approached him for getting his favour in proper treatment of his relative. Prasad ordered one of his men to talk to the concerned Doctor to ensure proper remedy to him and moved towards a badly lit corner of parking space. While the commandos approached him towards the parking space, an ambassador car stopped near him and few unidentified gunners opened fire upon Prasad and his men. Three personnel were shot dead on the spot and other ran away except his personal bodyguard Lahmeshwar Shah who was also killed on the spot.

See also 
Caste politics in India
Ashok Mahto gang
List of massacres in Bihar
Surajbhan Singh
Shri Prakash Shukla
Vijay Kumar Shukla

References 

1998 deaths
Rashtriya Janata Dal politicians
Bihari politicians
Indian murder victims
Crime in Bihar
Caste-related violence in Bihar
People murdered in Bihar
Deaths by firearm in India
People from East Champaran district
Assassinated Indian politicians
1998 murders in India
Janata Dal politicians
State cabinet ministers of Bihar